Yaw Frimpong (born 4 December 1986, in Accra) is a Ghanaian professional footballer.

Career
He began his career in Feyenoord Academy, was 2005 promoted to first team, on 15 November 2008 was on trial at Sweden side Helsingborgs IF, later joined than on 16 January 2009 to ASEC Mimosas. After two season with ASEC Mimosas signed in December 2010 for Asante Kotoko.

International career
He was member of the Ghana national under-23 football team for the camp for the 2006 Olympic qualifications.

Honours 

ASEC Mimosas

 Côte d'Ivoire Premier Division: 2009, 2010

Asante Kotoko

 Ghana Premier League: 2011–12, 2012–13
 Ghana Super Cup: 2012

TP Mazembe

 DR Congo Championship : 2013, 2013–14, 2015–16, 2016–17
 DR Congo Super Cup : 2013, 2014, 2016
 CAF Champions League : 2015
 Confederation Cup : 2016, 2017, runner up: 2013
 CAF Super Cup : 2016, runner up : 2017

References

External links 
TP Mazembe Profile

1988 births
Living people
Ghanaian footballers
ASEC Mimosas players
TP Mazembe players
Expatriate footballers in Ivory Coast
Ghanaian expatriate sportspeople in Ivory Coast
West African Football Academy players
Ghanaian expatriate footballers
Expatriate footballers in the Democratic Republic of the Congo
Ghanaian expatriate sportspeople in the Democratic Republic of the Congo
Association football forwards